The DRS RQ-15 Neptune is a reconnaissance UAV developed in the United States in the early years of the 21st century. The design is optimized for operations over water, and is capable of water landings on its flying boat–like hull. The 11.2 kW (15 hp) pusher engine is mounted high to keep it dry during takeoffs and landings. The Neptune can also be launched off a pneumatic catapult and land on a skid. In 2007, one was unsuccessfully launched off the USS Nashville (LPD-13), crashing into the water less than two seconds after lift off.

Specifications

References

This article contains material that originally came from the web article Unmanned Aerial Vehicles by Greg Goebel, which exists in the public domain.
 
 Manufacturer's website

RQ-015
2000s United States military reconnaissance aircraft
Unmanned military aircraft of the United States
Single-engined pusher aircraft
Mid-wing aircraft
Tailless aircraft
Amphibious aircraft
Flying boats
Aircraft first flown in 2002
Twin-boom aircraft